Ocinebrina aciculata is a species of sea snail, a marine gastropod mollusk in the family Muricidae, the murex snails or rock snails.

Subspecies and varieties
 Ocinebrina aciculata aciculata (Lamarck, 1822): synonym of Ocinebrina aciculata (synonyms: Fusus gyrinus Brown, 1827; Fusus lavatus Philippi, 1836; Murex aciculatus var. curta Monterosato in Bucquoy, Dautzenberg & Dollfus, 1882; Murex aciculatus var. elongata Monterosato, 1878; Murex aciculatus var. minor Monterosato in B. D. & D., 1882; Ocinebrina aciculata var. cingulifera Pallary, 1920; Ocinebrina aciculata var. scalariformis Monterosato in Coen, 1933; Ocinebrina corallinus var. major Pallary, 1900; Ocinebrina titii (Stossich, 1865); Ocinebrina titii minor Monterosato in Settepassi, 1977)
 Ocinebrina aciculata corallinoides Pallary, 1912: synonym of Ocinebrina corallinoides Pallary, 1912
 Ocinebrina aciculata var. cingulifera Pallary, 1920 : synonym of Ocinebrina aciculata (Lamarck, 1822)
 Ocinebrina aciculata var. scalariformis Monterosato in Coen, 1933: synonym of Ocinebrina aciculata (Lamarck, 1822)

Description

Distribution
This species occurs in the following locations:
 European waters
 Mediterranean Sea+
 Northeast Atlantic Ocean: Azores

References

 Hayward, P.J.; Ryland, J.S. (Ed.) (1990). The marine fauna of the British Isles and North-West Europe: 1. Introduction and protozoans to arthropods. Clarendon Press: Oxford, UK. . 627 pp.
 Crocetta F., Bonomolo G., Albano P.G., Barco A., Houart R. & Oliverio M. (March 2012) The status of the northeastern Atlantic and Mediterranean small mussel drills of the Ocinebrina aciculata complex (Mollusca: Gastropoda: Muricidae), with the description of a new species. Scientia Marina 76(1): 177–189.

Ocenebrinae
Gastropods described in 1822